Cyrtinus is a genus of longhorn beetles of the subfamily Lamiinae, containing the following species:

 Cyrtinus acunai Fisher, 1935
 Cyrtinus araguaensis Howden, 1973
 Cyrtinus beckeri Howden, 1960
 Cyrtinus bifasciatus Martins & Galileo, 2009
 Cyrtinus bordoni Joly & Rosales, 1990
 Cyrtinus eugeniae Fisher, 1935
 Cyrtinus farri Howden, 1960
 Cyrtinus fauveli (Cameron, 1909)
 Cyrtinus granulifrons Howden, 1970
 Cyrtinus hispidus Martins & Galileo, 2009
 Cyrtinus hubbardi Fisher, 1926
 Cyrtinus humilis Zayas, 1975
 Cyrtinus jamaicensis Howden, 1970
 Cyrtinus melzeri Martins & Galileo, 2009
 Cyrtinus meridialis Martins & Galileo, 2010
 Cyrtinus mockfordi Howden, 1959
 Cyrtinus mussoi Joly & Rosales, 1990
 Cyrtinus oakleyi Fisher, 1935
 Cyrtinus opacicollis (Bates, 1885)
 Cyrtinus penicillatus (Bates, 1885)
 Cyrtinus pygmaeus (Haldeman, 1847)
 Cyrtinus querci Howden, 1973
 Cyrtinus sandersoni Howden, 1959
 Cyrtinus schwarzi Fisher, 1926
 Cyrtinus striatus Joly & Rosales, 1990
 Cyrtinus subopacus Fisher, 1935
 Cyrtinus umbus Martins & Galileo, 2009

References

Cyrtinini